Ride is the second album by the American pop singer-songwriter, actor Jamie Walters. It was released on June 24, 1997, through Atlantic Records.

Track listing

Personnel
 Jamie Walters – lead vocals, guitars (tracks: 2 to 5, 10, 11)
 Steve Tyrell – production, keyboards

Additional musicians
 Michael Landau – guitars (inc. solo on 4 to 6)
 Tim Pierce – guitars (inc. solo on 2, 10, 11)
 Bob Mann – bass, keyboards (track 1)
 Leland Sklar – bass (tracks: 2, 3, 6 to 11)
 Jack Daley – bass (tracks: 4, 5)
 Mike Finnigan – keyboards (tracks: 1, 3, 4), backing vocals (tracks: 5, 7, 10, 11)
 Jim Cox – keyboards (tracks: 5, 6, 7, 9, 10)
 Kevin Savigar – keyboards (tracks: 1, 2, 7, 9), drum programming (tracks: 3, 6, 9)
 Alex Brown – backing vocals  (tracks: 1, 5, 7)
 Marlena Jeter – backing vocals  (tracks: 1, 5, 7)
 Mortonette Jenkins – backing vocals  (tracks: 1, 5, 7)
 Zach Throne – backing vocals (tracks: 2 to 4, 6, 8, 9)  
 Abe Laboriel Jr. – drums (tracks: 3, 6, 7)   
 Gary Mallaber – drums (tracks: 1, 10, 11)
 Russ Kunkel – drums (tracks: 2, 8, 9)
 Cindy Blackman – drums (tracks:  4, 5)

Other personnel
 Paul Buckmaster – string arrangements, conductor
 Thomas Bricker – artwork
 Doug Sax, Nilesh Patel – mastering
 Chris Lord-Alge, Barry Coffing, Jack Daley – mixing
 Kevin Williamson – A&R
 Andrea Forshee – album coordinator
 Joe Fischer, Robbie McPherson, Stephanie Fink – production assistant
 Tina Bilao, Jill Greenberg – photography

In popular culture 
The song "Reckless" was performed by Walters on the season 6 episode of Beverly Hills, 90210 called "Ray of Hope" in 1996. Walters returned to the show later that year and performed the song "The Great Escape" on the episode "Lost in Las Vegas" from season 7.

Tour 
Walters toured the US and Europe in support of Ride. The performances consisted of only Walters and Zach Throne on acoustic guitars. There were also some dates in Europe with a full band.

Notes 

1997 albums
Atlantic Records albums
Jamie Walters albums